Els Demol (born 28 January 1958, in Leuven) is a Belgian politician and is affiliated to the N-VA. She was elected as a member of the Belgian Chamber of Representatives in 2010.

Notes

Living people
Members of the Chamber of Representatives (Belgium)
New Flemish Alliance politicians
1958 births
Politicians from Leuven
21st-century Belgian politicians
21st-century Belgian women politicians